The dot-winged antwren (Microrhopias quixensis) is a passerine bird in the antbird family. In the past it was sometimes known as the velvety antwren, and some of its more distinctive subspecies have their own infrequently used English names. It is a resident in tropical Central and South America from southeastern Mexico south to western Ecuador, northern Bolivia, central Brazil and the Guianas. It is the only member of the genus Microrhopias.

This is a common bird of the understory of wet forest, especially at edges and clearings, tall second growth,  and in cacao plantations.  The female lays two brown-spotted white eggs which are incubated by both sexes, in a small, deep, plant fibre and dead leaf cup nest 1–12 m high in a tree on a thin twig in thick foliage. The male and female parents both feed the chicks.
 
The dot-winged antwren is a warbler-like bird, typically 11 cm long, and weighing 8.5 g. The adult male is mainly velvety black, with a broad white wing bar and white spots on the wing coverts. The female shares the male's wing pattern, but has dark slate upperparts and rufous underparts. There are significant variations in the plumage depending on the exact subspecies; in the male this mainly involves the amount of white in the wings and tail, and this is reflected in the female. However, in the female the subspecies also differ in the darkness of the upperparts (bicolor of the south-central Amazon is relatively pale grey above), and the amount of rufous below (quixensis of the northwestern Amazon has a black throat, nigriventris found along the east Andean slope in Peru has a black belly and chin, and emiliae of the southeastern Amazon has black underparts except for the rufous chest). Young birds are sooty-brown above, shading to dull cinnamon below. The underpart colouration is more extensive and more rufous in young females.

This species has a whistled peep call, and the song is an ascending whistle and trill, chee chee chee-che-che-chr,r,r,r, but with some geographical variations.

The dot-winged antwren is found as pairs or family groups, and sometimes with other antwrens as part of a  mixed-species feeding flock It feeds on small insects and other arthropods taken from twigs and foliage in the thickets or vine tangles.  It is often seen foraging in more exposed positions than its relatives.

The genus Microrhopias  was erected by the English zoologist Philip Sclater in 1862.

References

 Stiles and Skutch,  A guide to the birds of Costa Rica

Further reading

dot-winged antwren
Birds of Mexico
Birds of Central America
Birds of Belize
Birds of Costa Rica
Birds of Panama
Birds of Colombia
Birds of the Amazon Basin
Birds of Ecuador
Birds of the Peruvian Amazon
Birds of the Guianas
Least concern biota of North America
Least concern biota of South America
dot-winged antwren
dot-winged antwren